Cabo Corrientes is a cape on the Pacific coast of the Mexican state of Jalisco. It marks the southernmost point of the Bahía de Banderas (Bay of Flags), upon which the port and resort city of Puerto Vallarta stands. The municipality in which the cape lies is also called Cabo Corrientes.

Cabo Corrientes is a prominent navigational landmark, featured on the earliest cartography of the region.  Cruising sailors often refer to it as Mexico's Point Conception.

Notes

Corrientes
Landforms of Jalisco
Pacific Coast of Mexico
Puerto Vallarta